Jack Bernstein (November 5, 1899 – December 26, 1945) was an American boxer given the birthname John Dodick.  He became World Junior lightweight Champion, on May 30, 1923, against Johnny Dundee at the Coney Island Velodrome in Brooklyn.  When he lost the title to Dundee on December 17, 1923, in a fifteen-round split decision at Madison Square Garden, many newspapers felt Bernstein clearly had the edge in the bout and should have retained the title.

Early life and boxing career
John Dodick was born on December 5, 1899, in New York's Lower East Side, the second of seven children. He was compelled to drop out of elementary school to help his father, a fruitseller, support their large family.  K. O. Brown, a leading lightweight contender, was reputed to be his first mentor at the Boys Club he attended, and a source of encouragement. According to one source, Dodick's third bout was with future lightweight legend Benny Leonard in a no decision six rounder. Dodick debuted in the New York fight clubs under the name "Young Kiddy" at age 15.

While stationed on the Mexican border after joining the army during World War I, he defeated Nick Gundy, Mexican Champ, in a tough twenty-round match in El Paso. As victor, he was given the title Featherweight Border Champion. Returning to his family's new home in Yonkers, Dodick continued fighting in local clubs, but discouraged, quit for a while to drive a truck.  A new manager, druggist Lou Hirsch, took Dodick on, giving him the name Jack Bernstein, using the surname of the former local legend, Jewish featherweight contender, Joe Bernstein.

In a bout in which several papers wrote he deserved at least a draw, Bernstein lost to French Jewish boxer Benny Valger, a serious lightweight contender, on December 1, 1921, in a slashing twelve round-match in Yonkers, New York.  Valger would come close to winning the lightweight championship against Johnny Kilbane in 1920, and would complete his long career without a single loss by knockout.

Jr. Lightweight champion, 1923

A contender by 1922, Bernstein won fourteen of his sixteen bouts that year, and beat known contenders Solly Seeman, Pal Moran, Kid Wagner, and Babe Herman. Winning a string of bouts in 1923, he finally met Jr. Lightweight Champion Johnny Dundee on May 30, in the Velodrome, in front of a crowd of 15,000.  Though an underdog, he won a unanimous fifteen-round decision and took the title after coming back from a third-round knockdown.

Loss of Jr. Lightweight title, 1923
Seven months later on December 17, 1923, in one of his first sanctioned defenses of the title, Bernstein lost to Johnny Dundee at Madison Square Garden in a highly controversial split decision.  BoxRec noted that several newspaper sources, including the prestigious New York Times, believed the judges made the wrong decision in the bout. Author Ken Blady wrote that several of the judges may have been influenced to vote against Bernstein. Not all papers believed the fight was a runaway win for Bernstein, however. Although the Milwaukee Journal noted that Dundee finished strong in the bout, and agreed with the decision they also noted "the sentiment of the crowd, based on the fighters' round-by-round showing, was that Bernstein had won easily." Typical of the strong language of the many papers that disagreed with the decision was the Milwaukee Sentinel, who wrote "By probably the worst decision in local boxing history, Johnny Dundee of Jersey City regained his Junior Lightweight championship from Jack Bernstein."

In their third and final meeting Bernstein would beat Dundee decisively on September 15, 1924, in fifteen rounds in Queensboro Stadium in Queens.

In 1924, Bernstein fought Sammy Mandell and Rocky Kansas to draws.  Mandell would hold the Lightweight World Championship from July 3, 1926 – July 17, 1930.  After first drawing with Mandell in the Garden on January 11, 1924, in fifteen rounds, he lost to Mandell on May 16, 1924, in Louisville and on November 27, 1924, at Madison Square Garden.  He drew with Kansas on February 18, 1924, in Buffalo, previously having beaten him on October 23, 1923, in the Garden. Kansas would later hold the Jr. Lightweight title for the first half of 1926.

From 1924-27, Bernstein defeated Tommy O'Brien, Cuddy DeMarco, and Ray Miller.  Bernstein defeated Jimmy Goodrich twice in both February and April 1927.  Goodrich held the Lightweight Championship from July 13, 1925 – December 7, 1925. After defeating Goodrich,  Bernstein had fought all three successors to Benny Leonard's lightweight crown, Mandell, Kansas, and Goodrich in competitive full length matches.

Decline and retirement
Noticing he was losing stamina in late rounds, and feeling more fatigued than usual, Bernstein sought medical treatment on the advice of his handler "Doc" Lou Hirsh at the Battle Creek Sanatorium in Michigan around 1927, taking four months off. He fought well for a year, and then began losing a number of fights, again suffering from exhaustion.  Bernstein's extremely rare knockout loss to Bruce Flowers on December 1, 1928, influenced his decision to leave boxing.  It is quite possible that the fatigue he felt were the early signs of the heart condition with which he was diagnosed in 1945.

He retired as a competitor around the end of 1931, and promoted boxing around Westchester, New York, often benefiting philanthropic causes.  On December 26, 1945, Bernstein died of a heart attack at St. Joseph's Hospital in Yonkers, New York. He had suffered from a heart ailment for many years and was aged 46 at the time of his death.

Honors
Bernstein, who was Jewish, was inducted into the International Jewish Sports Hall of Fame in 2000.

Selected fights

|-
| align="center" colspan=8|15 Wins, 9 Losses, 2 Draws 
|-
| align="center" style="border-style: none none solid solid; background: #e3e3e3"|Result
| align="center" style="border-style: none none solid solid; background: #e3e3e3"|Opponent(s)
| align="center" style="border-style: none none solid solid; background: #e3e3e3"|Date
| align="center" style="border-style: none none solid solid; background: #e3e3e3"|Location
| align="center" style="border-style: none none solid solid; background: #e3e3e3"|Duration
| align="center" style="border-style: none none solid solid; background: #e3e3e3"|Notes
|-
| Win
| Nick Gundy
| Dec 1918
| Fort Bliss, El Paso
| 20 Rounds 
| "Border light title"
|-
| Loss
| Nick Gundy
| Dec 2, 1918
| Fort Bliss, El Paso
| 10 Rounds 
| 
|-
| Loss
| Benny Valger
| Dec 1, 1921
| Yonkers
| 12 Rounds 
| Strong Lightwt. contender
|-
| Loss
| Archie Walker
| May 6, 1922
| Brooklyn, NY
| 12 Rounds 
| Rare early loss
|-
| Win
| Archie Walker
| June 28, 1922
| Yonkers, NY
| 12 Rounds 
|  
|-
| Win
| Solly Seeman
| Jul 8, 1922
| New York
| 12 Rounds 
| Strong Lightwt. contender
|-
| Win
| Pal Moran
| Oct 14, 1922
| New York
| 12 Rounds 
| Strong Lightwt. contender
|-
| Win
| Babe Herman
| Nov 28, 1922
| New York
| 12 Rounds 
| Strong Lightwt. contender  
|-
| Win
| Eddie Wagner
| Dec 11, 1922
| Mad. Sq. Gard., NY
| 10 Rounds UD 
| Strong Lightwt. contender 
|-
| Win
| Johnny Dundee
| May 30, 1923
| Brooklyn, NY
| 15 Rounds UD 
| Won World Jr. light title
|-
| Win
| Freddie Jacks
| Jun 25, 1923
| Brooklyn, NY
| 8 Rounds KO
| Kept Jr. light title
|-
| Win
| Harry Kabakoff
| Jul 10, 1923
| Brooklyn, NY
| 10 Rounds NWS 
| Non-title 
|-
| Loss
| Harry "Kid" Brown
| Jul 31, 1923
| Brooklyn, NY
| 8 Rounds NWS 
| Non-title
|-
| Win
| Rocky Kansas
| Oct 12, 1923
| Mad. Sq. Gard., NY
| 15 Rounds UD 
|  
|-
| Loss
| Johnny Dundee
| Dec 17, 1923
| Mad. Sq. Gard., NY
| 15 Rounds SDClose fight
| Lost World Jr. Light Title 
|-
| style="background: #dae2f1"|_Draw
| Sammy Mandell
| Jan 11, 1924
| Mad. Sq. Gard., NY
| 15 Rounds 
| Mandell broke hand
|-
| style="background: #dae2f1"|_Draw
| Rocky Kansas
| Feb 18, 1924
| Buffalo, NY
| 10 Rounds
|
|-
| Win
| Jack Zivic
| Jul 23, 1924
| Buffalo, NY
| 12 Rounds
| Elim. Bout for Light title
|-
| Win
| Johnny Dundee
| Sep 15, 1924
| Queens, NY
| 12 Rounds
| 
|-
| Win
| Johnny Dundee
| Sep 15, 1924
| Queens, NY
| 12 Rounds
| 
|-
| Loss
| Sammy Mandell
| Nov 7, 1924
| Mad. Sq. Gard., NY
| 12 Rounds
| 
|-
| Loss
| Sammy Mandell
| Nov 7, 1924
| Mad. Sq. Gard., NY
| 12 Rounds
| 
|-
| Loss
| Sid Terris
| Aug 31, 1925
| Queens, NY
| 12 Rounds
| 
|-
| Loss
| Sid Terris
| Dec 12, 1925
| Polo Grounds, NY
| 10 Rounds
| 
|-
| Win
| Jimmy Goodrich
| Feb 21, 1927
| Brooklyn, NY
| 10 Rounds
| 
|-
| Win
| Jimmy Goodrich
| Apr 1, 1927
| Buffalo, NY
| 10 Rounds
|

See also
List of select Jewish boxers

References

Further reading
 Blady, Ken, The Jewish Boxers' Hall of Fame, (1988). Shapolsky Publishers, Inc, New York, Pgs. 133-138.

External links
 
Jewish Sports bio
Jack Bernstein - CBZ Profile

|-

  

1899 births
1945 deaths
Jewish boxers
Jewish American boxers
Boxers from New York City
Super-featherweight boxers
Featherweight boxers
World super-featherweight boxing champions
World boxing champions
American male boxers
20th-century American Jews
United States Army personnel of World War I